School of Graduate and Postdoctoral Studies may refer to:

A school at Rosalind Franklin University
A school at University of Western Ontario